General Sir John D'Arcy Anderson,  (23 September 1908 – 16 April 1988) was a British Army officer who reached high office in the 1960s.

Early life
John D'Arcy Anderson was born on 23 September 1908 in Downpatrick, Ireland, the only son of Reginald D'Arcy Anderson. He was educated at Winchester College and New College, Oxford.

Military career
Anderson was commissioned into the 5th Royal Inniskilling Dragoon Guards in 1929. He served in the Second World War in France, the Middle East and Italy.

After the war Anderson was appointed General Officer Commanding 11th Armoured Division in Germany in 1955 and then Chief of Staff at Headquarters Northern Army Group and British Army of the Rhine in 1956. He became Director of the Royal Armoured Corps in 1958 and Director General of Military Training at the War Office in 1959.

Anderson was appointed Deputy Chief of Imperial General Staff in 1961 and Military Secretary in 1963. Finally he became Commandant of the Imperial Defence College in 1966; he retired in 1968. He was appointed a Knight Commander of the Order of the Bath in the 1961 New Year Honours.

Anderson was also the first Colonel Commandant of Ulster Defence Regiment from 1969 to 1979. In that capacity he escorted the Queen during her Silver Jubilee visit to Northern Ireland in 1977. A purpose built operations centre for the UDR was built at Ballykinler army base and named in honour of the general who was known as "The father of the UDR".

From 1962 to 1967 Anderson was Colonel of the 5th Royal Inniskilling Dragoon Guards.

Public service
Anderson was appointed High Sheriff of County Down for 1974.

Family life
Anderson married Elizabeth Antoinette Merrifield Walker. They had no children.

References

External links
Generals of World War II

|-

|-
 

|-

1908 births
1988 deaths
Military personnel from County Down
People from Downpatrick
People educated at Winchester College
Alumni of New College, Oxford
British Army generals
British Army brigadiers of World War II
Knights Grand Cross of the Order of the British Empire
Knights Commander of the Order of the Bath
Companions of the Distinguished Service Order
5th Royal Inniskilling Dragoon Guards officers
High Sheriffs of Down